Hsieh Cheng-peng and Christopher Rungkat were the defending champions but chose not to defend their title.

Nicolás Barrientos and Miguel Ángel Reyes-Varela won the title after defeating Yuki Bhambri and Saketh Myneni 2–6, 6–3, [10–6] in the final.

Seeds

Draw

References

External links
 Main draw

Gwangju Open - Doubles
2022 Doubles